This is a list of casinos in Wisconsin.

List of casinos

Gallery

See also
List of casinos in the United States 
List of casino hotels

References

External links

 
Wisconsin
Casinos